William Meeke (3 January 1758 – 15 July 1830) was a Member of Parliament for Callan in the Irish Parliament from 1790 to 1797 and for Penryn, Cornwall, firstly in the House of Commons of Great Britain (1796–1800) and then in the House of Commons of the United Kingdom (1801–1802).

The son of Joseph Easton Meeke of Rotherhithe by his wife Suffina, he was educated at Charterhouse School and Emmanuel College, Cambridge. He was a Fellow of Downing College, Cambridge from 1800 to 1807, when he married Mary Kelly. His sister Elizabeth married the MP Samuel Farmer.

References

1758 births
1830 deaths
Irish MPs 1790–1797
Members of the Parliament of Great Britain for constituencies in Cornwall
British MPs 1796–1800
Members of the Parliament of the United Kingdom for constituencies in Cornwall
UK MPs 1801–1802
People educated at Charterhouse School
Alumni of Emmanuel College, Cambridge
Fellows of Downing College, Cambridge
Members of the Parliament of Ireland (pre-1801) for County Kilkenny constituencies